Kūlgrinda is a secret underwater causeway in the history of Lithuania.

Kūlgrinda may also refer to one of the following.

Kūlgrinda (band), a Lithuanian pagan folk band
Kūlgrinda, a 1984 historical novel by Petras Dirgėla